Who's Foolin' Who may refer to:

Who's Foolin' Who (One Way album), a One way album from 1982.
Who's Foolin' Who (Bonfire album), A Bonfire greatest hits album from 2000.
"Who's Foolin’ Who", A song from  Tony Iommi's 2000 solo album Iommi featuring Ozzy Osbourne.